Hesham Mesbah (born March 17, 1982) is an Egyptian judoka.  He won a bronze medal in the 2008 Summer Olympics in Beijing, Egypt's first judo medal in 24 years.

Achievements

External links
 
 

1982 births
Living people
Egyptian male judoka
Judoka at the 2004 Summer Olympics
Judoka at the 2008 Summer Olympics
Judoka at the 2012 Summer Olympics
Olympic judoka of Egypt
Olympic bronze medalists for Egypt
Olympic medalists in judo
Medalists at the 2008 Summer Olympics
African Games gold medalists for Egypt
African Games medalists in judo
Mediterranean Games silver medalists for Egypt
Mediterranean Games medalists in judo
Competitors at the 2007 All-Africa Games
Competitors at the 2005 Mediterranean Games
20th-century Egyptian people
21st-century Egyptian people